The Mala Synagogue (Malayalam: മാള ജൂതപ്പള്ളി) is one of the oldest extant synagogues in India and was built by the historic Malabar Jews of Kerala. It is located at Mala, a small town in Thrissur district of Kerala state in south India.

The Mala synagogue is owned and managed by the Mala Panchayat now.
During 1954–1955, due to the Aliyah of the Malabar Jewish community from Kerala to Israel, the community had handed over both the Mala Synagogue and the associated Jewish Cemetery to the Mala Panchayat for safekeeping.
The Synagogue is currently defunct and does not have any religious material inside it .

History
The Mala Synagogue is a heritage monument of the Malabar Jews and a standing example of the syncretic religious history of Kerala together with the several other Synagogues in Kerala that are still existing around Paravur and Kochi.
A hypothesis even proposes that the town's name Mala may have originated from the Hebrew word "Mal-Aha", which means "Center of Refugee".

Establishment of Synagogue 
There are different opinions made by from historians about the origin of the Mala Synagogue.

According to Prem Doss Swami Doss Yehudi, a Dravidian Judaist and historian, an ancient Jewish Malayalam folk song mentions that the synagogue was built in the 11th century using the wood donated to Joseph Rabban in 1000 CE by the king of the erstwhile Kodungallur Kingdom.
The first structure was dismantled during the 14th century due to unknown reasons (presumably after the Great Periyar Flood of 1341 but not necessarily due to the floods) and a new building was constructed in 1400.

This reconstructed 14th century synagogue was renovated almost four centuries later, in 1792, most likely to repair the damages suffered during the Mysorean invasion of Kerala by Tipu Sultan during the Second Anglo-Mysore War of early 1780s.
However, Rev. Thomas Dawson, a CMS missionary stationed in Kochi during 1817, had a different opinion. During his site visits, he found that even though almost three decades had passed since Tipu Sultan's surrender of Malabar to the British in 1792, the synagogue building still remained in ruins.

In 1909, the old 19th century building was rebuilt (in part or in full) on the same foundation.

There is also another view on the existence of historical evidence indicating that the Synagogue was constructed in 1597 .

Synagogue in the Piyyutim of Cochin jews

After aliyah in 1955 
When the Mala Jewish community started migrating to Israel in 1955, the Synagogue was handed over to Mala Gram Panchayat on 20 December 1954. The Panchayat now owns the Synagogue and it was used as a hall. 
The Synagogue comes with a cemetery which was also handed over Mala Gram Panchayat on 1 April 1955.

Decades of Neglect

Restoration

Mala Jews

Architecture 
All the 8 synagogues in Kerala built during the recent centuries — located at Chendamangalam, Paravoor, Mala, Kochi and Ernakulam — have similar traditional architectural features:

 a central bimah of brass or silver metal on a concrete or stone base
 an ark on the western wall
 a balcony above the eastern entry to the sanctuary that is used by the reader on certain holidays.
 a women's gallery behind the balcony, with a stairway leading up to it, usually from outside the building.

Mala Jewish Cemetery

See also 

 Cochin Jews
 Mala
 Muziris
 List of synagogues in Kerala
 Cochin Jewish Architecture
 History of the Jews in India
 Gathering of Israel
 Judaism
 Anjuvannam

References

External links

Cochin Jews
Orthodox Judaism in India
Orthodox synagogues
Tourist attractions in Thrissur district
Synagogues in Kerala
History of Thrissur district
Sephardi Jewish culture in India
Sephardi synagogues
Religious buildings and structures in Thrissur district
16th-century synagogues
Religious buildings and structures completed in 1597
1597 establishments in India